Aleksandar Malinov Metro Station is a station on the Sofia Metro in Bulgaria. It started operation on 8 May 2015.

Interchange with other public transport

 City Bus service: 4, 76, 88, 111, 113, 213, 305, 306, 314
Night service: N1

Location

References

External links
 Sofia Metropolitan
 SofiaMetro@UrbanRail
 Sofia Urban Mobility Center
 Sofia Metro station projects

Sofia Metro stations
Railway stations opened in 2015
2015 establishments in Bulgaria